Osmium tetroxide (also osmium(VIII) oxide) is the chemical compound with the formula OsO4. The compound is noteworthy for its many uses, despite its toxicity and the rarity of osmium. It also has a number of unusual properties, one being that the solid is volatile.  The compound is colourless, but most samples appear yellow. This is most likely due to the presence of the impurity OsO2, which is yellow-brown in colour. In biology, its property of binding to lipids has made it a widely-used stain in electron microscopy.

Physical properties

Osmium(VIII) oxide forms monoclinic crystals. It has a characteristic acrid chlorine-like odor.  The element name osmium is derived from osme, Greek for odor. OsO4 is volatile: it sublimes at room temperature. It is soluble in a wide range of organic solvents. It is moderately soluble in water, with which it reacts reversibly to form osmic acid (see below). Pure osmium(VIII) oxide is probably colourless; it has been suggested that its yellow hue is attributable due to osmium dioxide (OsO2) impurities. The osmium tetroxide molecule is tetrahedral and therefore nonpolar. This nonpolarity helps OsO4 penetrate charged cell membranes. OsO4 is 518 times more soluble in carbon tetrachloride than in water.

Structure and electron configuration
The osmium of OsO4 has an oxidation number of VIII; however, the metal does not possess a corresponding 8+ charge as the bonding in the compound is largely covalent in character (the ionization energy required to produce a formal 8+ charge also far exceeds the energies available in normal chemical reactions). The osmium atom exhibits double bonds to the four oxide ligands, resulting in a 16 electron complex. This is isoelectronic with permanganate and chromate ions.

Synthesis
OsO4 is formed slowly when osmium powder reacts with O2 at ambient temperature. Reaction of bulk solid requires heating to 400 °C.

Os + 2O2 ->[\Delta T] OsO4

Reactions

Oxidation of alkenes
Alkenes add to OsO4 to give diolate species that hydrolyze to cis-diols. The net process is called dihydroxylation. This proceeds via a [3 + 2] cycloaddition reaction between the OsO4 and alkene to form an intermediate osmate ester that rapidly hydrolyses to yield the vicinal diol. As the oxygen atoms are added in a concerted step, the resulting stereochemistry is cis.

OsO4 is expensive and highly toxic, making it an unappealing reagent to use in stoichiometric amounts. However, its reactions are made  catalytic by adding reoxidants to reoxidise the Os(VI) by-product back to Os(VIII). Typical reagents include H2O2 (Milas hydroxylation), N-methylmorpholine N-oxide (Upjohn dihydroxylation) and K3Fe(CN)6/water. These reoxidants do not react with the alkenes on their own. Other osmium compounds can be used as catalysts, including osmate(VI) salts ([OsO2(OH)4)]2−, and osmium trichloride hydrate (OsCl3·xH2O). These species oxidise to osmium(VIII) in the presence of such oxidants.

Lewis bases such as tertiary amines and pyridines increase the rate of dihydroxylation. This "ligand-acceleration" arises via the formation of adduct OsO4L, which adds more rapidly to the alkene. If the amine is chiral, then the dihydroxylation can proceed with enantioselectivity (see Sharpless asymmetric dihydroxylation). OsO4 does not react with most carbohydrates.

The process can be extended to give two aldehydes in the Lemieux–Johnson oxidation, which uses periodate to achieve diol cleavage and to regenerate the catalytic loading of OsO4. This process is equivalent to that of ozonolysis.

Coordination chemistry
OsO4 is a Lewis acid and a mild oxidant. It reacts with alkaline aqueous solution to give the perosmate anion . This species is easily reduced to osmate anion, .

When the Lewis base is an amine, adducts are also formed.  Thus OsO4 can be stored in the form of osmeth, in which OsO4 is complexed with hexamine. Osmeth can be dissolved in tetrahydrofuran (THF) and diluted in an aqueous buffer solution to make a dilute (0.25%) working solution of OsO4.

With tert-BuNH2, the imido derivative is produced:
OsO4  +  Me3CNH2   →  OsO3(NCMe3) + H2O
Similarly, with NH3 one obtains the nitrido complex:
OsO4 + NH3 + KOH → K[Os(N)O3] + 2 H2O
The [Os(N)O3]− anion is isoelectronic and isostructural with OsO4.

OsO4 is very soluble in tert-butyl alcohol. In solution, it is readily reduced by hydrogen to osmium metal. The suspended osmium metal can be used to catalyze hydrogenation of a wide variety of organic chemicals containing double or triple bonds.
OsO4 + 4 H2 → Os  + 4 H2O

OsO4 undergoes "reductive carbonylation" with carbon monoxide in methanol at 400 K and 200 sbar to produce the triangular cluster Os3(CO)12:

3 OsO4  +  24 CO   →   Os3(CO)12  +  12 CO2

Oxofluorides
Osmium forms several oxofluorides, all of which are very sensitive to moisture.
Purple cis-OsO2F4 forms at 77 K in an anhydrous HF solution:
 OsO4 + 2 KrF2 → cis-OsO2F4 + 2 Kr + O2

OsO4 also reacts with F2 to form yellow OsO3F2:
 2 OsO4 + 2 F2 → 2 OsO3F2 + O2

OsO4 reacts with one equivalent of [Me4N]F at 298 K and 2 equivalents at 253 K:
 OsO4 + [Me4N]F → [Me4N][OsO4F]

 OsO4 + 2 [Me4N]F → [Me4N]2[cis-OsO4F2]

Uses

Organic synthesis
In organic synthesis OsO4 is widely used to oxidize alkenes to the vicinal diols, adding two hydroxyl groups at the same side (syn addition). See reaction and mechanism above. This reaction has been made both catalytic (Upjohn dihydroxylation) and asymmetric (Sharpless asymmetric dihydroxylation).

Osmium(VIII) oxide is also used in catalytic amounts in the Sharpless oxyamination to give vicinal amino-alcohols.

In combination with sodium periodate, OsO4 is used for the oxidative cleavage of alkenes (Lemieux-Johnson oxidation) when the periodate serves both to cleave the diol formed by dihydroxylation, and to reoxidize the OsO3 back to OsO4. The net transformation is identical to that produced by ozonolysis. Below an example from the total synthesis of Isosteviol.

Biological staining

OsO4 is a widely used staining agent used in transmission electron microscopy (TEM) to provide contrast to the image. This staining method may also be known in the literature as the OTO (osmium-thiocarbohydrazide-osmium) method, or osmium impregnation technique or simply as osmium staining. As a lipid stain, it is also useful in scanning electron microscopy (SEM) as an alternative to sputter coating. It embeds a heavy metal directly into cell membranes, creating a high electron scattering rate without the need for coating the membrane with a layer of metal, which can obscure details of the cell membrane. In the staining of the plasma membrane, osmium(VIII) oxide binds phospholipid head regions, thus creating contrast with the neighbouring protoplasm (cytoplasm). Additionally, osmium(VIII) oxide is also used for fixing biological samples in conjunction with HgCl2. Its rapid killing abilities are used to quickly kill live specimens such as protozoa. OsO4 stabilizes many proteins by transforming them into gels without destroying structural features. Tissue proteins that are stabilized by OsO4 are not coagulated by alcohols during dehydration. Osmium(VIII) oxide is also used as a stain for lipids in optical microscopy. OsO4 also stains the human cornea (see safety considerations).

Polymer staining
It is also used to stain copolymers preferentially, the best known example being block copolymers where one phase can be stained so as to show the microstructure of the material. For example, styrene-butadiene block copolymers have a central polybutadiene chain with polystyrene end caps. When treated with OsO4, the butadiene matrix reacts preferentially and so absorbs the oxide. The presence of a heavy metal is sufficient to block the electron beam, so the polystyrene domains are seen clearly in thin films in TEM.

Osmium ore refining
OsO4 is an intermediate in the extraction of osmium from its ores. Osmium-containing residues are treated with sodium peroxide (Na2O2) forming Na2[OsO4(OH)2], which is soluble.  When exposed to chlorine, this salt gives OsO4. In the final stages of refining, crude OsO4 is dissolved in alcoholic NaOH forming Na2[OsO2(OH)4], which, when treated with NH4Cl, to give (NH4)4[OsO2Cl2]. This salt is reduced under hydrogen to give osmium.

Buckminsterfullerene adduct
OsO4 allowed for the confirmation of the soccer ball model of buckminsterfullerene, a 60-atom carbon allotrope. The adduct, formed from a derivative of OsO4, was C60(OsO4)(4-tert-butylpyridine)2. The adduct broke the fullerene's symmetry, allowing for crystallization and confirmation of the structure of C60 by X-ray crystallography.

Safety considerations

OsO4 will irreversibly stain the human cornea, which can lead to blindness. The permissible exposure limit for osmium(VIII) oxide (8 hour time-weighted average) is 2 µg/m3. Osmium(VIII) oxide can penetrate plastics and food packaging, and therefore must be stored in glass under refrigeration.

References

External links
International Chemical Safety Card 0528
NIOSH Pocket Guide to Chemical Hazards
CDC - Osmium Tetroxide - NIOSH Workplace Safety and Health Topic
BBC report on bomb plot
BBC What is Osmium tetroxide article
Osmium Tetroxide: Molecule of the Month
Chemical Reactions

Osmium compounds
Transition metal oxides
Oxidizing agents
Staining dyes
Electron microscopy stains
Foul-smelling chemicals